The Last Horror Movie is a 2003 British found footage horror film directed by Julian Richards. On 24 August 2003 it premiered at the London FrightFest Film Festival and stars Kevin Howarth and Mark Stevenson. The Last Horror Movie was released onto DVD through Fangoria's Gore Zone label on 7 December 2004.

Plot

The film follows Max Parry (Kevin Howarth), a disturbed wedding video cameraman, and his unnamed assistant (Mark Stevenson) as they perform several murders that they have videotaped. The two have used a video store tape in order to record the proceedings, breaking the fourth wall, and insinuating that the copy of the film being watched is the only existing version of the tape. Throughout the film, Max uses meta-references in order to show off his gruesome activities as a serial killer. The film raises questions surrounding visceral pleasure, this can be seen in one scene in particular during which the audience cannot see the victims (two at once) being murdered, Max Parry then asks the audience, "I bet you wanted to see that, and if you didn't, why are you still watching?"

At the end of the film the audience is left to believe that since they are watching the only copy of the film, that they will potentially become one of Max's victims.

Cast
Kevin Howarth as Max
Mark Stevenson as The Assistant
Antonia Beamish as Petra
Christabel Muir as Sam
Jonathan Coote as John
Rita Davies as Grandma
Joe Hurley as Ben (as Joe Morley)
Jamie Langthorne as Nico
John Berlyne as Phil
Linda Regan as Terri
Mandy Gordon as Sarah
Jim Bywater as Bill
Lisa Renée as Waitress
Christopher Adamson as Killer (as Chris Adamson)
Adrian Johnson as Kelly
John MacCrossan as Groom

Development
Richards stated that he was inspired to create The Last Horror Movie after reading Stephen King's Danse Macabre. Richards was also inspired by "the idea of using horror fiction to help people explore their anxieties about difficult issues", as he has the main character of Max Parry using it as a way to "justify his crimes to the world". The movie was filmed with a small crew on a limited budget, with most of the film's issues stemming from the prosthetic make-up effects, as they "had to work real time whilst remaining hidden from the camera".

Release
Hart Sharp Video released the DVD Director's Cut and normal cut versions of the film on 7 December 2004. Arts Alliance America also released the film on DVD that same day. Hart Sharp Video has re-released the film several times since their original releases of the film as a part of several multi-disk sets on 4 October 2005 and 2 October 2007. The film was last released on DVD by Jinga Films on 26 August 2014.

Reception

ReelFilm criticized the movie as being "repetitive" and that the film would have worked better as a short. Peter Bradshaw from The Guardian awarded the film 1/5 stars, calling it "smug and drearily nasty".

In contrast, Dread Central gave a more positive review and stated that "It's a movie that makes you think, and that's far too rare nowadays." Marc Savlov from Austin Chronicle gave the film 2.5 out of 5 stars, writing, " Despite the film’s horrific verisimilitude... and a genuinely smart screenplay by Richards and James Handel that simultaneously rubs our noses in the horror while allowing us to savor the flavor – and thereby become complicit in Max’s onscreen theatrics"

Awards

 2005 - Buenos Aires Rojo Sangre Film Festival - Best Film - Winner
 2005 - Buenos Aires Rojo Sangre Film Festival - Best Actor (Kevin Howarth) - Winner
 2004 - Espoo Ciné - Méliès d'Argent, Grand Prize of European Fantasy Film in Silver - Winner
 2004 - Fantasporto - Critics' Award - Winner
 2004 - Fantasporto - International Fantasy Film Award - Nominee only
 2004 - New York City Horror Film Festival - Best Actor (Kevin Howarth) - Winner
 2004 - New York City Horror Film Festival - Best Feature Film - Winner
 2004 - Rhode Island International Horror Film Festival - Best Director (Julian Richards) - Winner
 2003 - Festival of Fantastic Films (UK) - Best Independent Feature Award -Winner
 2003 - Raindance Film Festival - Jury Prize for Best UK Feature - Winner
 2003 - Festival de Cine de Sitges - Best Film - Nominee Only

Sequel
Richards first expressed interest about creating a sequel in 2003, where he remarked that if it was created, the film would either remain in the found footage video diary format of its predecessor or be a "more conventional slasher movie". In 2012 Richards confirmed that he is actively developing a sequel and that it would be set several years after the events of the first film. The sequel would have Max living in Los Angeles and showing an obsession with social networking sites, which he uses to select his victims.

References

External links
 
 
 

2003 films
British slasher films
2000s slasher films
2003 horror films
British independent films
British mockumentary films
British serial killer films
Found footage films
Films about snuff films
Fangoria
Films about cannibalism
2003 independent films
2000s English-language films
2000s British films